

Summary

Dressage 
An NOC may enter up to 3 athletes if they qualified for the team competition

Team 

* Switzerland decided not to send a Team or an Individual to the Olympic Dressage competition after Silvia Iklé, the top rider on the Swiss team, refused to bring her horse, Salieri CH, to Hong-Kong due to the long travel and concerns over climatic conditions.

** 3 individuals qualified from the same nation from the Olympic rankings to make up a team

*** Brazil sent only two riders

Individual 

Individual qualification decided by the FEI Olympic Riders Ranking as of May 1, 2008.

* Other places to complete the quota will be allocated to best ranked individuals not qualified above and invitation places.

** Switzerland decided not to send a Team and replaced by NOCs of the next highest ranked eligible athletes on the FEI Olympic Riders Ranking.

*** Unused quotas replaced by NOC of the next highest ranked eligible athletes on the FEI Olympic Riders Ranking.

Eventing 
An NOC may enter up to 5 athletes if they qualified for the team competition, or up to 2 athletes if they didn't.

Team 

* Event not held

** made up of minimum 3 to a maximum of 5 individuals qualified from the same nation from the Olympic rankings to make up a team

Individual 
Individual qualification will be decided by the FEI Olympic Riders Ranking as of May 1, 2008.

* Other places to complete the quota will be allocated to best ranked individuals not qualified above and invitation places.

** Unused quota replaced by NOC of the next highest ranked eligible athletes on the FEI Olympic Riders Ranking.

Jumping 

An NOC may enter up to 4 athletes if they qualified for the team competition, or up to 2 athletes if they didn't.

Team

Individual 

Qualification for the 2008 Summer Olympics